The 1993 Bank of the West Classic was a women's tennis tournament played on indoor carpet courts at the Oakland Coliseum Arena in Oakland, California in the United States and was part of the Tier II category of the 1993 WTA Tour. It was the 22nd edition of the tournament ran from November 1 through November 7, 1993. First-seeded Martina Navratilova won the singles title, her fifth at the event after 1979, 1980, 1988 and 1991, and earned $75,000 first-prize money as well as 300 ranking points.

Finals

Singles
 Martina Navratilova defeated  Zina Garrison-Jackson 6–2, 7–6(7–1)
 It was Navratilova's 5th singles title of the year and the 166th of her career.

Doubles
 Patty Fendick /  Meredith McGrath defeated  Amanda Coetzer /  Inés Gorrochategui 6–2, 6–0

References

External links
 Official website
 ITF tournament edition details
 Tournament draws

Bank of the West Classic
Silicon Valley Classic
Virginia Slims of California
Virginia Slims of California
Virginia Slims of California